Ipoh Barat is a federal constituency in Kinta District, Perak, Malaysia, that has been represented in the Dewan Rakyat since 1995.

The federal constituency was created in the 1994 redistribution and is mandated to return a single member to the Dewan Rakyat under the first past the post voting system. This is only one of two constituencies naming in same city. Another one is Ipoh Timor.

Demographics

History

Polling districts
According to the federal gazette issued on 31 October 2022, the Ipoh Barat constituency is divided into 30 polling districts.

Representation history

State constituency

Current state assembly members

Local governments

Election results

References

Perak federal constituencies